What You Know may refer to:

 "What You Know" (T.I. song), 2006
 "What You Know" (Two Door Cinema Club song), 2010
 "What You Know", a song by The Levellers from the 1990 album A Weapon Called the Word

See also

What do you know (disambiguation)